Indrajeet is a 1991 Bollywood action film directed by K. V. Raju. The film stars Amitabh Bachchan and Jaya Prada in lead roles, with Kumar Gaurav, Neelam, Saeed Jaffrey, Sadashiv Amrapurkar, Kader Khan in supporting roles. The film was a remake of the director's own Kannada film Bandha Muktha (1987), starring Tiger Prabhakar.

Plot summary
 
Honest Police officer Inderjeet's life takes a turn for the worse when he has to arrest his lady love Shanti's (Jaya Prada) father, Mr. Din Dayal for murder, but gets transferred. Years later, retired Inderjeet arranges his adopted daughter Neelu's (Neelam Kothari) marriage with Vijay (Kumar Gaurav), but the married couple gets killed by Shanti's brother and his friends. When the police take no action, Inderjeet decides to take the law into his hands to avenge his adopted daughter's death.

Cast

Amitabh Bachchan as Indrajeet
Jaya Prada as Shanti
Kumar Gaurav as Vijay
Neelam as Neelu
Saeed Jaffrey as Seth Dindayal
Sadashiv Amrapurkar as DSP Shyam Sunder
Kader Khan as Minister Sadachari
Ajit Pal Mangat as Ajit Kumar
Avtar Gill as Inspector Vishnu
Vijayendra Ghatge as Inspector Sudhir
Ashutosh Gowarikar as Ashu
Ajinkya Deo
Mahesh Anand as Mahesh Sadachari, minister Sadachari's son
Kamal Kapoor as College Principal
Gulshan Bawra as Khurana, Secretary of Seth Dindayal
Suresh Chatwal as Chandu , Union Leader /Biological father of Neelu
Nirupa Roy as Mother of Indrajeet seen only in photo frame (Uncredited)
Shagufta Ali as Item Dancer in Hotel Bar (Special Appearance) in the song reshmi zulfien

Soundtrack

All music was composed by Rahul Dev Burman and penned by Gulshan Bawra.

External links
 
 Cult of Kumar

1990s Hindi-language films
1991 films
Indian action films
Hindi remakes of Kannada films
Films scored by R. D. Burman
Fictional portrayals of the Maharashtra Police
Rose Audio Visuals
1991 action films